Qikiqtaryuaq, formerly Melbourne Island, is an island located in the Kitikmeot Region, Nunavut, Canada. It lies at the western end of Queen Maud Gulf and is dominated by lakes and marshlands.

Qikiqtaryuaq is made up of several small islands, including Kiillinnguyaq to the south and Victoria Island to the north. The region also includes numerous smaller islands that are home to a variety of wildlife such as polar bears, Arctic foxes, snow geese, walruses, seals, narwhals and beluga whales.

The waters surrounding Qikiqtaryuaq are rich in fish species such as Arctic char, lake trout and whitefish. The island also serves as an important breeding ground for seabirds such as northern fulmars and kittiwakes.

Inuit have inhabited the area around Qikiqtaryuaq since ancient times. They have traditionally hunted marine mammals such as seals and walrus in these waters for food and materials used for clothing and tools.

Today, Qikiqtaryuaq remains a place with a lot of local people still visiting it for hunting trips or fishing expeditions each year.

References 

 

Uninhabited islands of Kitikmeot Region